The Mills River is located in Transylvania and Henderson counties, North Carolina, United States is a tributary of the French Broad River.  The river flows out of the Pisgah Ranger District of the Pisgah National Forest in two forks: the North Fork, which drains the slopes just south of the Blue Ridge Parkway between Asheville and Mount Pisgah, and the South Fork, which drains the area of the Pisgah Ranger District just east of the Cradle of Forestry in America, including the slopes of Black Mountain.  The Mills River flows into the French Broad River northwest of Hendersonville between NC 191 and Interstate 26.

The North Mills River Recreation Area, located on the North Fork of the river, is a popular local attraction for camping, hiking, and fishing. The Mills River is used as a water source for the cities of Asheville and Hendersonville.

References

External links 
 North Mills River Recreation Area Information at hikewnc.info

Rivers of North Carolina
Pisgah National Forest
Rivers of Transylvania County, North Carolina
Rivers of Henderson County, North Carolina